Work & Stress is a quarterly peer-reviewed academic journal covering occupational health psychology and workplace health and safety. It is published by Taylor & Francis in association with the European Academy of Occupational Health Psychology.

History and scope 
The journal was established in 1987 by founding editor-in-chief Tom Cox (Birkbeck, University of London). The first volumes were principally concerned with work and stress, "the central focus of occupational health psychology". The journal's scope expanded over time to cover more occupational health psychology-related topics. In 2000 the journal became affiliated with the European Academy of Occupational Health Psychology. The journal's scope currently includes occupational health psychology and workplace health and safety. Toon Taris (Utrecht University) succeeded Tom Cox as editor in 2014.

Abstracting and indexing 
The journal is abstracted and indexed in:

See also 
 Journal of Occupational Health Psychology
 Occupational Health Science
 Occupational medicine
 Occupational stress
 Society for Occupational Health Psychology

References

External links 
 

Occupational health psychology
Publications established in 1987
Occupational psychology journals
Quarterly journals
English-language journals
Taylor & Francis academic journals